Die Hoërskool Menlopark (colloquially known as Menlo or Parkies) is a public Afrikaans medium co-educational high school situated in the suburb of Menlo Park in Pretoria in the Gauteng province of South Africa. Its pupils call themselves as Parkies.

The school was founded in 1963 by the painter Bettie Cilliers-Barnard. When established it had 12 classrooms and 372 students in grades 8, 9 and 10 (then called Standards 6, 7 and 8). Cilliers-Barnard also designed the school emblem.

Headmasters 

List of headmasters at Die Hoërskool Menlopark.
 G.P.L van Ziji (1963–1973) 
 F. Gerber (1973–1980) 
 F. Booysen (1980–1984) 
 C.I.S. van der Merwe (1984–2013) 
 S. Reynders (2013–present)

Notable alumni 
In order of final year at Hoërskool Menlopark (date in brackets)
Jana Cilliers (1965), actress
Laurie Dippenaar (1966), founder FirstRand Group
Koos Kombuis (1972), Afrikaans writer, singer and songwriter (born André le Roux du Toit)

Calie Pistorius (1975), Vice Chancellor of University of Pretoria; now VC at University of Hull, United Kingdom
Stefan Swanepoel (1975), The New York Times bestselling author
Marita van der Vyver (1975), author
Johan Marais (1976) - South African professional rugby union player
Reggie Holmes (1976) - South African squash player
Henning Gericke (1977) - South African athlete
Anneli van Rooyen (1978) - South African singer/musician
Rudolf Straeuli (1981) -  Springbok and Lions rugby player, and Springbok coach during the Kamp Staaldraad affair
Jacques Olivier (1985) - South African professional rugby union player
André de Ruyter (1985) - South African businessman
Pieter Murray (1989) - trail runner
Amalia Uys (2002) - soapy actress
Gideon Louw (2005) - South African swimmer in the 2008 Summer Olympics, 2012 Summer Olympics and 2010 Commonwealth Games
 Adam Heyns (2007) - South African actor 
 Rassie van der Dussen (2007) - South African professional cricketer
 Heinrich Klassen (2009) - South African professional cricketer
 Theunis de Bruyn (2010) - South African professional cricketer 
 Stefan Vermaak (2010) - South African actor
 Charné van Biljon (2011) - South African hockey player
 Willem de Beer (2010) - South African painter
 Regardt Verster (2011) - South African cricketer 
 Inge Viljoen (2011) - South African heptathlon athlete
 Lenize Potgieter (2012) - South African netball player
 Lenke van Aarde (2012) - South African chess player
 Suné Luus (2014)  - South African women's professional cricketer
 Jacques Snyman (2014) - South African professional cricketer
 Delmi Tucker  (2015) - South African women's professional cricketer
 Stean Pienaar (2015) - South African professional rugby player
 Lohan Potgieter (2019) - South African professional rugby player
 Hanrie Louw (2019) - South African field hockey player

References

External links 

School website

Schools in Gauteng
Educational institutions established in 1963
Afrikaans-language schools
1963 establishments in South Africa